Cavallano is a village in Tuscany, central Italy, administratively a frazione of the comune of Casole d'Elsa, province of Siena. At the time of the 2001 census its population was 118.

Cavallano is about 40 km from Siena and 4 km from Casole d'Elsa.

References 

Frazioni of Casole d'Elsa